The University of Colorado Denver (CU Denver) is a public research university in Denver, Colorado. It is part of the University of Colorado system.

History

University of Colorado System Anschutz Medical Campus

The University of Colorado created the Department of Medicine and Surgery in September 1883 in the Old Main building on the Boulder campus. The Department of Nursing opened in 1898.

By 1892, the last two years of classes were taught in Denver because the larger population afforded more practical experience. This practice triggered something of a turf battle with the University of Denver's medical school and the subsequent legal battle went to the state Supreme Court. In 1897, the court found that CU's charter restricted them to Boulder. However, in 1910, CU got an amendment to the state Constitution passed which allowed them to move back to Denver. In 1911, the School of Medicine combined with the Denver and Gross Medical College to form a larger school with a more comprehensive program, paving the way for the school's permanent move to Denver. In 1925, the School of Medicine moved to the campus on Ninth Avenue and Colorado Boulevard in Denver. This would become the University of Colorado Health Sciences Center (UCHSC).

In 1995, the Fitzsimons Army Medical Center was officially put on the Base Realignment and Closure list, after which officials from the Health Sciences Center, University of Colorado Hospital and the City of Aurora presented a proposal to the Department of Defense in Washington, D.C. to repurpose the decommissioned base as an academic health center. In 1999, the Army base was closed under the 1995 Base Realignment and Closure action. In 2004, the first UCHSC labs moved from Denver to the research towers on the Fitzsimons campus. In 2006, the Fitzsimons campus of UCHSC was renamed the Anschutz Medical Campus in recognition of philanthropic donations from Philip and Nancy Anschutz. By the end of 2008, academic and research operations of all CU Denver health sciences schools and colleges relocated from the Ninth Avenue and Colorado Boulevard campus to the new Anschutz campus, joining the affiliated University of Colorado Hospital and Children's Hospital.

In 2014, the University of Colorado appointed separate chancellors for the University of Colorado Denver and the University of Colorado Anschutz Medical Campus, effectively separating the two campuses. The campuses offer some dual campus programs, but the Anschutz Medical Campus is a separate institution and is independently referred to as CU Anschutz or CU Anschutz Medical Campus in official materials, and the Denver Campus is independently referred to as CU Denver in official materials.

University of Colorado Denver
The University of Colorado Denver began as the Extension Center of University of Colorado's Department of Correspondence and Extension, which was established in 1912. In 1938, the Extension Center acquired permanent quarters in Denver in the C.A. Johnson Building at 509 17th Street, where a single, full-time faculty member ran the school with the help of part-time teachers. In 1947, the Extension Center moved into the Fraternal Building at 1405 Glenarm Place. In 1956, the university acquired the Denver Tramway Company Building at 14th and Arapahoe Streets (now the Hotel Teatro and the Denver Center for the Performing Arts Tramway building). In 1964, the Extension Center was renamed the University of Colorado – Denver Center. On January 11, 1973, lawmakers, upon proclamation of the governor, amended the state constitution to establish additional CU campuses, transforming the University of Colorado—Denver Center into the University of Colorado Denver (CU Denver).

 Between 1973 and 1976, the State of Colorado built the Auraria Higher Education Center (AHEC) on a  downtown campus to be shared by the University of Colorado Denver, the Metropolitan State University of Denver and the Community College of Denver. In 1977, the Denver campus expanded to the newly opened AHEC, and later to several buildings extending into downtown Denver.

Merger, subsequent separation, and renaming
In the summer of 2004, the University of Colorado Denver and the University of Colorado Health Sciences Center merged to create the University of Colorado Denver and Health Sciences Center (UCDHSC). On October 29, 2007, the board of regents voted to rename UCDHSC as the University of Colorado Denver, consisting of the Anschutz Medical Campus and the Denver Campus. In August 2011, the regents approved a name change to the University of Colorado Denver | Anschutz Medical Campus (including the vertical bar), while the legal name of the dual institution remained University of Colorado Denver.

However, in 2014, the University of Colorado appointed separate chancellors for the University of Colorado Denver and the University of Colorado Anschutz Medical Campus, effectively separating the two campuses. The campuses offer some dual campus programs, but the Anschutz Medical Campus is independently referred to as CU Anschutz or CU Anschutz Medical Campus in official materials, and the Denver Campus is independently referred to as CU Denver in official materials. The marketing campaign ALL FOUR:COLORADO emphasizes the distinct identities of the Denver and Anschutz campuses alongside the other CU institutions, Boulder and Colorado Springs.

Beall's List

The university is known for its association with Beall's List, created by its former faculty member Jeffrey Beall and used by universities worldwide, and ultimately for the role the university played in the disappearance of the list. In an interview in 2018, Beall stated that "my university began to attack me in several ways. They launched a research misconduct investigation against me (after seven months, the result of the investigation was that no misconduct had occurred). They also put an unqualified, mendacious supervisor over me, and he constantly attacked and harassed me. I decided I could no longer safely publish the list with my university threatening me in these ways."

Campuses

CU Denver Campus

CU Denver, part of the Auraria Campus, is located to the southwest of downtown Denver in the Auraria Neighborhood, on Speer Boulevard and Auraria Parkway. In a unique arrangement, CU Denver shares certain facilities (such as the Tivoli Student Union) on the Auraria Campus with two additional institutes of higher education, Metropolitan State University of Denver and the Community College of Denver. Proprietary facilities such as the CU Denver Student Commons Building are not shared.  CU Denver Regional Transportation District's (RTD) Light Rail has two stops on the Auraria Campus: Colfax at Auraria and Auraria West Campus.

A student wellness center opened in Summer of 2018.

CU Denver features both undergraduate and graduate courses, with graduate students making up 32 percent of enrolled students. The campus is located in the heart of the central business district and is in close proximity to the Pepsi Center, Elitch Gardens, the Colorado Convention Center, the Denver Center for the Performing Arts, Larimer Square, and the 16th Street Mall. The reclaimed Tivoli brewery, which closed in 1969, houses the student union.

Institutional profile
University of Colorado Denver offers bachelor's, master's, doctoral, and first professional degrees.

Enrollment
In addition to on campus students the university has an additional 11,000 online students. 76% of the student population are full-time students, 16% are out-of-state residents, and international students make up 6% of total enrollment. 15,490 students are enrolled at CU (Fall, 2019). 41% of undergraduate students and 55% of new freshmen at CU Denver belong to an ethnic minority. The average entering ACT score for new freshmen at CU Denver is 22.9 composite. The average entering SAT scores at CU Denver is 549 Math and 542 Verbal. The average high school GPA for new freshmen is 3.37. The most popular undergraduate majors at CU Denver are biology, psychology, pre-engineering, music, and economics. International students on the campus arrive from 125 countries. The 2020 average 6-year graduation rate was 48%.

The CU Denver campus has 14,000 enrolled students as of Fall 2022. 52 percent of undergraduate students and 25 percent of graduate students belong to minority groups. US News gives the school a diversity index rating of 0.68, ranking 75th of national universities.

Academics
University of Colorado Denver has the largest graduate business school and graduate school of education in Colorado.

Libraries
The Auraria library on the CU Denver campus downtown serves the three institutions that share the campus — CU Denver, Metropolitan State University of Denver and Community College of Denver. The library houses nearly 1 million print books, 130,000 e-books, 44,000 e-journals and 300 databases.

Schools and colleges
The university offers degrees in a wide variety of academic fields such as music industry, engineering, business, film & television, culture, history, language, digital design, the natural sciences, and biomedical sciences. CU Denver hosts 8 schools and colleges: the College of Architecture and Planning, the College of Arts & Media, The Business School, the School of Education & Human Development, the College of Engineering, Design, and Computing, the College of Liberal Arts and Sciences, the School of Public Affairs and its Presidential Climate Action Project, and the Graduate School. The College of Liberal Arts and Sciences is CU Denver's largest school offering 23 baccalaureate degrees, 17 master's degrees, and 4 PhD programs. The College of Arts & Media is home to The Music & Entertainment Industry Studies (MEIS) Department, the largest music department in the Rocky Mountain Region. CU Denver sponsors the only college of architecture and planning in Colorado. The College of Architecture and Planning is located on 14th street, offering graduate degrees in architecture, urban design, historic preservation, urban and regional planning, and landscape architecture. In the engineering areas, the downtown campus has worked with Lockheed Martin and Raytheon.

School of Medicine for the University of Colorado System

The University of Colorado School of Medicine is the medical school of the University of Colorado system. It is separate from the University of Colorado Denver, located at the Anschutz Medical Campus in Aurora, Colorado, one of the four University of Colorado system campuses. The medical school and CU Denver offer some dual programs.

College of Arts & Media

The College of Arts & Media (CAM) was the first college in Colorado devoted exclusively to Arts and Entertainment. The college is focused on the intersections of arts, technology, and commerce. With over 1,300 students in the college, it is one of the largest arts colleges in the Western U.S. CAM houses three departments: Music & Entertainment Industry Studies, Film & Television, and Visual Arts. The Music & Entertainment Industry Studies (MEIS) is one of the only contemporary focused music departments in the U.S. It is nationally known and ranked as one of the top contemporary music departments. MEIS attracts students from throughout the country and has over 500 enrolled students. There are currently four emphasis programs in MEIS: Music Business, Recording Arts, Music Performance, and Singer/Songwriter. The facilities used by the program include five recording studios, 16 practices rooms, a piano lab, a 200-seat King Center Recital Hall, and a 500-seat King Center Concert Hall. The Film & Television Program is the only BFA film and television program in Colorado. Over 250 students are enrolled in the department. The curriculum is hands-on and students generally start making films in Production One during the second semester of their freshman year. The Visual Arts Department houses programs in Art History, 3D Digital Animation, Photography, Digital Design, Illustration, and Art Practices. The college houses the renowned Digital Animation Center (DAC). All of the programs in the College of Arts & Media are hands-on and career focused.

Graduate school
The Graduate School at CU Denver | Anschutz awards more graduate degrees than any other institution in Colorado. The school consists of nearly 60 graduate programs. The departments running these programs are housed in the schools and colleges on both campuses of the university. These offerings include both department-based and interdisciplinary programs in architecture and planning, arts and media, biomedical sciences, business, education and human development, engineering and applied sciences, humanities, sociology, applied mathematics, nursing, public affairs, public health, chemistry, and social sciences. Graduate programs at the Anschutz Medical Campus offer MS and PhD degrees focusing on basic, clinical and translational research in the biomedical sciences.

Business School

The University of Colorado Denver Business School is accredited by AACSB International. The school is accredited at both the undergraduate and graduate levels. The Business School is one of only a few schools in the US to have a separate accreditation for its Accounting program. Business is one of the school's most popular majors since it is located in the heart of Downtown Denver.  The Business School has worked with some of Colorado's top businesses such as Molson Coors, Wells Fargo, First Bank and Frontier Airlines, who provide feedback on the school's curriculum.

School of Public Affairs

The School of Public Affairs at CU Denver is ranked 25th among schools of public affairs in the United States and is fully accredited by the Network of Schools of Public Policy, Affairs, and Administration (NASPAA). The school offers a number of highly ranked programs, including environmental policy, nonprofit management and public management. The online Master of Criminal Justice program was recently ranked in the top 10 nationwide by U.S. News & World Report. Students can choose from a wide range of innovative Master of Public Affairs and Master of Criminal Justice concentrations. The school also offers a Ph.D. in Public Affairs and recently launched a highly successful Bachelor of Criminal Justice undergraduate degree. Through community events and the timely research of the Buechner Institute for Governance, the School of Public Affairs is committed to making a real impact in Colorado, the region and beyond.

Rankings

The graduate school ranked 68th in the biological sciences in 2007. The Music Business Program was ranked in the top 11 in the U.S. by billboard magazine in 2014. In 2009, the university ranked 34th on the Forbes list of best public colleges. For 2021, U.S. News & World Report ranked the university 113th in Top Public Schools, 106th in Top Performers on Social Mobility, and 161th in Best Undergraduate Engineering Programs. In 2007, the Business School was the fifth Best Graduate School for Physician – Executives according to Modern Healthcare.

Student life

University of Colorado Denver has over 100 student organizations, honor societies, professional organizations and faith-based groups, that offer social, service, and professional opportunities for their members within the university and community. First time freshmen and first time international students at the downtown campus are encouraged to live on campus in the Campus Village Residence Halls, a student housing complex at the Auraria Campus for students, faculty and staff from any of the three schools that share the campus. CU Denver provides a variety of sports and recreation activities to students, faculty and staff, including personal training, intramural basketball, volleyball, soccer, squash, and tennis, and sports equipment check out for on or off campus use.

The CU Denver student newspaper is called the "CU Denver Sentry". The Distinguished Lecture Series hosts an array of speakers, that have included David Horowitz and Malcolm-Jamal Warner. The Tivoli Student Union serves as a student center for the Community College of Denver, Metropolitan State University of Denver and University of Colorado Denver.

Notable people

Notable faculty
 Jeffrey Beall, founder of Beall's list
 Mary E. Guy, political scientist, public administration scholar
 Mark A. Heckler, founding dean of its College of Arts and Media
 Nobel Laureate Tom Cech, of CU Boulder, is an affiliated faculty with CU Denver's Department of Biochemistry and Molecular Genetics.
 Leo Franca from the Department of Mathematical and Statistical Sciences has developed stabilized finite elements, important in computational mechanics and engineering simulation.
 Lawrence Hunter is the founder of the International Society for Computational Biology, the world's oldest and largest professional organization for bioinformatics and computational biology.
 Bill Porter, a famous audio engineer from the School of Music, created the first college program in audio engineering

Notable alumni
Rick Alden, Class of 1996, Owner and CEO of Skullcandy
Insook Bhushan, Olympic table tennis player
Janet Bonnema, civil engineer, first woman allowed to enter a tunnel project in Colorado
Deanne Criswell, first female leader of Federal Emergency Management Agency
Daniel Gilbert (psychologist), author of Stumbling on Happiness and Edgar Pierce Professor of Psychology at Harvard University
Christi Grimm, Principal Deputy Inspector General at the Office of Inspector General, U.S. Department of Health and Human Services
Michael B. Hancock, Class of 1995, Mayor of Denver
Illenium, Class of 2013, American EDM DJ.
Aaron Kopp, Class of 2009, filmmaker, director/producer of Liyana
Amanda Kopp, Class of 2008, filmmaker, director/producer of Liyana
Frances McConnell-Mills, Class of 1918, toxicologist
John Morse, Class of 2001, former Majority Leader of the Colorado State Senate
Karen Middleton, Class of 1996, former member of the Colorado House of Representatives and current Executive Director of Cobalt (formerly known as NARAL Pro-Choice Colorado)
Tenzing Rigdol, contemporary Tibetan artist and activist
Carlos Samour, Associate Justice of the Colorado Supreme Court
Isaac Slade, Class of 2005, former lead singer and co-founder of Denver-based rock band The Fray
Don Southerton, American writer
Gloria Tanner, Class of 1976, first African-American woman to be a Colorado State Senator
Jun Xia, Class of 1989, Chinese architect and lead designer of the Shanghai Tower

Notes

References

Further reading

External links

 

 
UC Denver
UC Denver
Auraria Campus
Education in Denver
Education in Aurora, Colorado
Educational institutions established in 1912
1912 establishments in Colorado
Denver